Fatah (Arabic: فَتْح fat·ḥ) is an Arabic name and surname, meaning "open, begin, start, commence". A variant of the name is Fattah, also spelt Fattaah (Arabic: فَتَّاح fattāḥ) which denotes the same or similar meaning. 

Notable people with the name Fatah include:

 Abdul Fatah Haqqani (died 2011), Afghanistani alleged Taliban activist
 Abdel-Fatah Qudsiyeh (born 1953), deputy director of the Syrian National Security Bureau 
 Abdoul Fatah (Malagasy politician) (active 2007)
 Abdoul-Fatah Mustafa (born 1984), Cameroonian footballer
 Abdul Fatah Younis (1944–2011), Libyan senior military officer
 Chopy Fatah (born 1983), Kurdish singer
 Essam Abdel-Fatah (born 1965), Egyptian football referee
 Fatah Ait Saada (born 1978), Algerian artistic gymnast
 Fatah Masoud (born 1989), Libyan futsal goalkeeper.
 Fatah Nsaief (born 1951), Iraqi football goalkeeper
 Fatah Said (born 1986), Moroccan footballer
 Ismail Fatah al-Turk (1934/38 – 2004), Iraqi painter and sculptor
 Karim Adel Abdel Fatah (born 1982), Egyptian footballer
 Mir-Fatah-Agha (AKA Mushthaid, before 1829 – 1892), high-ranking Twelver Shi'a Muslim cleric in the Caucasus
 Natasha Fatah (active from 1996), Canadian journalist
 Rebwar Fatah (active from 1982), Kurdish writer and journalist
 Ridzuan Fatah Hasan (born 1981), Singaporean football player
 Tarek Fatah (born 1949), Canadian writer, broadcaster, secularist and liberal activist